Joseph Burt Scott (October 2, 1920 – March 21, 2013) was an American baseball outfielder and first baseman who played in several different Negro leagues.

A left-handed hitter, Scott played from 1936 through 1956 for the New York Black Yankees, Pittsburgh Crawfords, Chicago American Giants, Memphis Red Sox and Zulu Cannibal Giants.

Scott attended Tilden Tech High School in Chicago. He was the only player of color on his high school team which won the 1937 city championship played at Wrigley Field. He was 5'7" and weighed 160 during his playing career.

In 1942, Scott had a batting average of .714 in 58 games before the season was ended early due to World War II. He went on to serve in the US Army during the war.

In 2008, Major League Baseball staged a special draft of the surviving Negro league players, doing a tribute for those ballplayers who were kept out of the Big Leagues because of their race. MLB clubs each drafted a former NLB player, and Scott was selected by the Milwaukee Brewers.

Scott died on March 21, 2013 after suffering a stroke while sleeping.  He was 92.

References

External links
 and Seamheads

1920 births
2013 deaths
African-American baseball players
Baseball first basemen
Baseball outfielders
Baseball players from Chicago
Chicago American Giants players
Memphis Red Sox players
New York Black Yankees players
People from Memphis, Tennessee
Pittsburgh Crawfords players
Zulu Cannibal Giants players
20th-century African-American sportspeople
21st-century African-American people
United States Army personnel of World War II